Leo Herbert Lehmann (1895-1950) was an Irish author, editor, and director of a Protestant ministry, Christ's Mission in New York. He was a priest in the Roman Catholic Church who later in life converted to Protestantism and served as the editor of The Converted Catholic Magazine. He authored magazine articles, books and pamphlets, condemning the programs and activities of the Roman Catholic Church.

Educational background and priesthood 
Lehmann was born in 1895 in Kingstown, County Dublin, Ireland, to Edmund and Emma Lehmann. He attended Mungret College in Limerick, and All Hallows College in Dublin. He was awarded advanced academic degrees in theology, including a Licentiate of Sacred Theology (STL) and Doctorate of Divinity (DD).

Publications 
Behind the Dictators, Leo H. Lehmann, (New York: Agora Publishing Co., 1942)
Vatican policy in the second world war, Leo H. Lehmann, (New York: Agora Publishing Co., 1945)

References 

1895 births
20th-century Irish Roman Catholic priests
Converts to Protestantism from Roman Catholicism
Alumni of All Hallows College, Dublin
People from Dún Laoghaire
1950 deaths